Terryana Fatiah Shahab (born June 18, 1984), better known as Terry Shahab or Terry, is an Indonesian singer. She is best known for her recording of "Janji Manismu", which was a hit in Indonesia.

Early life 
Terry was born in Jakarta and resides in Central Jakarta, Jakarta. She began singing as a child.

Singing career 
Terry started her career on 2004 as professional back-up singer for band Dewa 19 and singer Audy. On the same year she was recording song with Rio Febrian on song "Katakanlah" for Febrian's album Ku Ada Disini. Her first single was Koes Plus's song titled "Hatiku Beku" who made her known as singer in Indonesia and that song appeared on compilation album titled "Now And Forever" in 2006. And on the same year, she released her first self-titled album "TERRY" with first single "Janji Manismu" which became hit in Indonesia and made her become new rising singer in Indonesia. Her second single was "Kepingan Hati" but this song failed on Indonesia music chart. On 2007, Terry got a chance to duet with singer from France Julian Cely for his first Indonesia album on song "Tentang Kita". That song was mix between Indonesian and French languages On 2011, she released her second album titled "Are You Ready" with single "Harusnya Kau Pilih Aku".

Influences
Terry has named Whitney Houston, Beyoncé and Celine Dion.

Discography

Studio albums
 TERRY (2006)
 Are You Ready (2011)
 Indah (2014)

Singles
 "Katakanlah" (with Rio Febrian) (2004)
 "Hatiku Beku" (2006)
 "Janji Manismu" (2006)
 "Kepingan hati" (2006)
 "Tentang Kita" (with Julian Cely) (2007)
 "Syahadat Cinta" (2008)
 "Setulus Hati" (with Nindy dan Lala Karmela) (2010)
 "Harusnya Kau Pilih Aku" (2011)
 "Ijinkan Aku Menyayangimu" (2011)
 "Kita Bisa" (with Yovie n Friends) (2011)
 "Butiran Debu" (2012)

Awards and nominations

References 

1984 births
Living people
21st-century Indonesian women singers
People from Jakarta